Vincent De Haître (born June 16, 1994) is a Canadian dual-sport athlete competing as both a speed skater and track cyclist who has been in sport since 2000. After competing at his second Olympic games in PyeongChang De Haître made the switch back over to track cycling where he has been competing as a member of the Canadian national team since the fall of 2018 in an effort to qualify for the 2020 Summer Olympics in Tokyo. It is expected that De Haître will return to speed skating in August 2021 after the summer Olympics have concluded.

Career

Speed skating
De Haitre started in speed skating competing in the Gloucester Concordes speed skating club. He looked up to fellow Olympian and Gloucester teammate Ivanie Blondin who would sometime compete at the club in her national team uniform to which De Haître looked at as inspiration. He won a silver medal in the 3000m relay at the 2011 Canada Winter Games and made his World Cup debut in 2013. De Haître qualified to compete as a member of Team Canada at the 2014 Winter Olympics in Sochi, Russia, by winning the 1000m event at the Canadian speed skating trials and finishing third in the 1500m. Along with the 500m race he set three personal bests by a significant margin to qualify. De Haître was the youngest speed skater for team Canada at the 2014 games and surprised himself by qualifying, he said that he was looking ahead to the 2018 games in PyeongChang and not Sochi. De Haître qualified to compete for Canada at the 2018 Winter Olympics.

Cycling
As a junior, he raced for the Ottawa Bicycle Club's Junior Team in both roads and track disciplines coached by Don Moxley, a team which produced several provincially and nationally successful junior cyclists. On the track he won the 1 km time trial at the 2013 Canadian Track Championships over Zachary Bell. During the 2014 Canadian trials in Aguascalientes, Mexico De Haître broke the Canadian record per kilometre. Also in 2014, De Haître competed at the 2014 Commonwealth games in Scotland where he finished fourth in the team spring and seventh in the per kilometre event.

Personal life
Born in Cumberland, Ontario, De Haître attended École secondaire catholique Béatrice-Desloges, a catholic French art high school and subsequently attended the University of Calgary to pursue a Bachelor of Arts degree while training with Canada`s national long track team.

Personal records

References

External links
 

1994 births
Living people
Canadian male speed skaters
Canadian male cyclists
Speed skaters at the 2014 Winter Olympics
Speed skaters at the 2018 Winter Olympics
Olympic speed skaters of Canada
Cyclists at the 2014 Commonwealth Games
Commonwealth Games competitors for Canada
Sportspeople from Ottawa
World Single Distances Speed Skating Championships medalists
Olympic cyclists of Canada
Cyclists at the 2020 Summer Olympics